Shooters Hill is a locality and mountain located  south of Oberon, New South Wales. Shooters Hill is a common location for snowfalls in the Central Ranges.

One can get good views over the area east of Shooters Hill at the tower location.

Shooters Hill Post Office opened on 1 December 1889 and closed in 1978.

Climate
Although there exists no climate data for the summit or even the upper slopes of Vulcan State Forest, there is, however, climate data existing for a lower region located farther south in the Gurnang State Forest.

The region is subject to high winds and volatile weather year-round. Snow falls heavily, although by no means a regular occurrence due to its northern latitude.

See also

 List of mountains in New South Wales
 Retreat River

References

External links
 

Towns in New South Wales
Mountains of New South Wales
Oberon Council